Jaclyn Moriarty (born 1968 in Perth) is an Australian novelist, most known for her young adult literature. She is a recipient of the Davitt Award and the Aurealis Award for best children's fiction.

Biography

Moriarty was raised in the north-west suburbs of Sydney. She has four sisters and one brother. Two of her sisters, Liane and Nicola, are also novelists. Moriarty studied English and Law at the University of Sydney upon graduating from high school. She then complete a Masters in Law at Yale University and a PhD at Gonville and Caius College, Cambridge

She worked as an entertainment and media lawyer for four years before becoming a full-time writer. The literary agent who picked up her first book, Feeling Sorry for Celia, was Australian author Garth Nix. Moriarty was previously married to Canadian writer Colin McAdam, and they have one young son, Charlie. She currently lives in Sydney.

The Ashbury/Brookfield series

The Ashbury/Brookfield Series is four novels that are not sequels but are linked. They all revolve around various students that attend the exclusive private school, Ashbury High, or the local comprehensive, Brookfield High. Many of the students cross over into more than one novel, but each novel is different and tells a different story. All novels are told through the various character's own writing (through letters, emails, exam papers, etc.).

The Ashbury/Brookfield series of novels are (in chronological order):
Feeling Sorry for Celia (2000)
Finding Cassie Crazy (2003) (AUS/UK title) The Year of Secret Assignments (US title)
The Betrayal of Bindy Mackenzie (2006) (AUS title) also published as Becoming Bindy Mackenzie (UK title), and The Murder of Bindy Mackenzie (US title)Dreaming of Amelia (2009) (AUS/UK title) also published as The Ghosts of Ashbury High (US title)

The Colours of Madeleine trilogy

This trilogy retains some familiar features of Moriarty's style, such as a loosely epistolary form (the use of alternating chapters in which characters speak in their own quite distinctive voices); a sneaky sense of humor; and a plot that keeps the reader off balance by constantly subverting the 'facts' that one thought one understood. But it also marks a departure in the direction of fantasy: the premise of the trilogy is, or at least appears to be, the existence of an almost fairyland-like parallel world, sealed off from our world but in connection with it via 'cracks,' through which letters, or even people, can travel. As usual with Moriarty, nothing is quite what it seems, and incidents and ideas that appeared incidental may turn out to be central. All three of the books in the trilogy have been released.

. Winner: Ethel Turner Prize for Young People's Literature, New South Wales Premier's Literary Awards 2015.

 Kingdoms & Empires series 

 The Extremely Inconvenient Adventures of Bronte Mettlestone (2017)
 The Slightly Alarming Tale of the Whispering Wars (2018)  – winner of the 2019 Griffith University Children's Book Award at the Queensland Literary Awards The Stolen Prince of Cloudburst (2020)  – shortlisted for 2021 Children's Book of the Year Award: Younger Readers and for the 2021 Children's Book Award at the Queensland Literary Awards

Other novelsI Have a Bed Made of Buttermilk Pancakes (2004)The Spell Book of Listen Taylor (2007) a young adult novel that is an adaptation of I Have a Bed Made of Buttermilk Pancakes.Gravity is the Thing'' (2019)

References

External links

 Jaclyn Moriarty's Official Website
 Jaclyn Moriarty's Blog

21st-century Australian novelists
1968 births
Living people
Writers from Sydney
Alumni of Gonville and Caius College, Cambridge
Australian women novelists
Australian children's writers
20th-century Australian novelists
University of Sydney alumni
21st-century Australian women writers
20th-century Australian women writers